The 1903 Washington football team was an American football team that represented the University of Washington during the 1903 college football season. In its second season under coach James Knight, the team compiled a 6–1 record, shut out five of seven opponents, and outscored all opponents by a combined total of 63 to 11. William Spiedel was the team captain.

Schedule

References

Washington
Washington Huskies football seasons
Washington football